Andy Marinos is a Zimbabwean former rugby footballer who played rugby league and rugby union professionally and represented Wales at rugby union.

Rugby league career
Marinos signed for Australian rugby league club the Sydney Bulldogs in 1996, playing in one match. In 1997, he represented South Africa at the Super League World Nines.

Rugby union career
A centre, Marinos played for the Stormers, Newport RFC and the Newport Gwent Dragons. He also represented Wales.

Administration
He later worked as the CEO of Rodney Parade, before returning to South Africa in 2005.

He was the CEO of SANZAAR, a rugby committee in charge of expanding and maintaining the game of rugby union in South Africa, New Zealand, Australia and Argentina since late 2015.

In December 2020 Marinos was announced as chief executive officer of Rugby Australia. He took over the position from interim CEO Rob Clarke in February 2021.

References

1973 births
Living people
White Rhodesian people
Zimbabwean expatriates in South Africa
Dragons RFC players
Zimbabwean rugby union players
Sportspeople from Harare
Wales international rugby union players
Stormers players
Canterbury-Bankstown Bulldogs players
South Africa national rugby league team players
South African rugby league players
Rugby union officials
Rugby union centres
Rugby league centres
Zimbabwean rugby league players
Alumni of Northwood School, Durban